Injar is a village in Dodangeh Rural District of the Central District of Hurand County, East Azerbaijan province, Iran. At the 2006 National Census, its population was 927 in 190 households, when it was in Hurand District of Ahar County. The following census in 2011 counted 805 people in 224 households. The latest census in 2016 showed a population of 708 people in 202 households; it was the largest village in its rural district.

References 

Populated places in East Azerbaijan Province